Casey Michael Beard is a colonel in the United States Space Force, and formerly in the United States Air Force, who is currently serving as the commander of the Space Delta 9, a newly activated unit within Space Force. In 2019, Beard was nominated for transfer to the U.S. Space Force from the U.S. Air Force. His previous assignment was as the deputy director of the Space Strategy and Plans Directorate in the Office of the Secretary of Defense for Policy, Pentagon, Washington D.C. He was the team leader who drafted the U.S. Space Force's first service doctrine.

Beard earned his commission through the Air Force Reserve Officer Training Corps in 2001 following graduation from Clemson University. He has served across multiple operational disciplines including nuclear operations, satellite communications, space situational awareness, space control, and operational level command and control.

Education 
 2001 Bachelor of Science, Chemistry, Clemson University, S. Car.
 2006 Squadron Officer School, Top Third Graduate, Maxwell AFB, Ala.
 2009 Master of Science, Space Studies, American Military University, in correspondence
 2009 U.S. Air Force Weapons School, Distinguished Graduate and Mission Award, Nellis AFB, Nev.
 2014 Air Command and Staff College, Distinguished Graduate, Maxwell AFB, Ala.
 2015 U.S. Air Force School of Advanced Air and Space Studies, Maxwell AFB, Ala.
 2018 National War College, Distinguished Graduate, Fort McNair, Washington D.C.

Assignments 
1. June 2001 – February 2002, Student, Officer Space Prerequisite Training; Student, Peacekeeper Initial Qualification Training, Vandenberg Air Force Base, Calif.
2. February 2002 – September 2002, Deputy Missile Combat Crew Commander, 400th Missile Squadron, F.E. Warren AFB, Wyo.
3. September 2002 – June 2003, Deputy Missile Combat Crew Commander Instructor, 90th Operational Support Squadron, F.E. Warren AFB, Wyo.
4. July 2003 – November 2004, Missile Combat Crew Commander; Flight Commander, 400th MS, F.E. Warren AFB, Wyo.
5. November 2004 – April 2006, Missile Combat Crew Commander Evaluator; Deputy Chief, Standardization and Evaluation Division, 90th Operations Group, F.E. Warren AFB, Wyo.
6. April 2006 – May 2006 Student, Squadron Officer School, Maxwell AFB, Ala.
7. May 2006 – September 2006, Student, Milstar Initial Qualification Training, Vandenberg AFB, Calif.
8. October 2006 – June 2008, Mission Commander; Lead Instructor, 4th Space Operations Squadron, Schriever AFB, Colo.
9. July 2008 – June 2009, Executive Officer, Space Innovation and Development Center, Schriever AFB, Colo.
10. June 2009 – December 2009, Student, USAF Weapons Instructor Course, Nellis AFB, Nev.
11. January 2010 – June 2013, Deputy Chief, Space Situational Awareness Branch; Chief, Defensive Operations Branch, 614th Air and Space Operations Center, Vandenberg AFB, Calif.
12. August 2013 – June 2014, Student, Air Command and Staff College, Maxwell AFB, Ala.
13. July 2014 – June 2015, Student, School of Advanced Air and Space Studies, Maxwell AFB, Ala.
14. July 2015 – July 2017, Commander, 1st SOPS, Schriever AFB, Colo.
15. August 2017 – June 2018, Student, National War College, Fort McNair, Washington D.C.
16. June 2018 – June 2020, deputy director, Space Strategy and Plans Directorate, Office of the Secretary of Defense for Policy, Pentagon, Washington D.C.
17. June 2020 – July 2020, Commander, 750th Operations Group, Schriever AFB, Colo.
18. July 2020 – present, Commander, Delta 9, Schriever AFB, Colo.

Effective dates of promotion

Awards and decorations
Col Beard has been awarded the following:

References 

Living people
Year of birth missing (living people)
Place of birth missing (living people)
Space Operations Command personnel
United States Air Force colonels
Clemson University alumni
National War College alumni